Az-Zakariyya or Zakaria was a Palestinian Arab village 25 km northwest of the city Hebron (al-Khalil) in the Hebron Subdistrict, and about  north-northwest of Bayt Jibrin, which was depopulated after the end of the  1948 Arab–Israeli War. The village had a population of 1,180 on 15,320 dunums in 1945. The village was named in honor of the prophet Zachariah.

In 1950, the Israeli army expelled the entire population that remained in the village and a new Jewish moshav, now Hebraized as Zekharia, was founded over the ruins of the Palestinian village.

Location
The village lay beside a Tell by the same name.  The Tell rests upon a high hilltop, whereas the village lay on a slightly elevated part of the valley below, on the northwest side of the hill. The hill rises to a maximum elevation of 372 meters above sea level, with a mean elevation of approximately 275 meters above sea level. The village lay next to the road between Bayt Jibrin and the Jerusalem-Jaffa highway. The streams of Wadi Ajjur and al-Sarara were located a few kilometers north of the village.

History
A tomb, dating from the early Iron Age, has been excavated here. Among the pottery found in the grave was a  figurine, representing Astarte.

A town called Beit Zacharia (var. Kefar Zacharia) existed on the hill in Roman times, from whence the village takes its name. According to Sozomen, the body of the prophet Zachariah was found here in 415 C.E. and a church and monastery were established. The village was under the administrative jurisdiction of Bayt Jibrin. 

On April 29, 1309 (=Dhu al-Qa’da 18, in the Hijri year 708), in   the early Mamluk era, two representatives from Az-Zakariyya; Farraj bin Sa‘d bin Furayj and Nassar bin ‘Amara bin Sa‘id; promised that the revenues of Az-Zakariyya should go to the Dome of the Rock and the Al-Aqsa Mosque.
However, by the end of Mamluk era, the village was a dependency of Hebron, and formed part of the waqf supporting the Ibrahimi Mosque.

In the 1480s C.E. Felix Fabri described how he stayed in a "roomy inn", next to a "fair mosque" in the village.

Ottoman era
In 1517, Az-Zakariyya  was incorporated into the Ottoman Empire with the rest of Palestine, and in 1596 the village appeared in the Ottoman tax registers  listed as Zakariyya al-Battih under the administration of the nahiya ("subdistrict") of Quds (Jerusalem), part of the Sanjak of Quds. It had a population of 47 Muslim households (an estimated 259 persons) and paid a fixed tax rate  of 33,3% on wheat, barley, olives, beehives, and goats; a total of 11,000 akçe. All of the revenue went to a waqf.  
 
A Maqam (shrine) in the village dedicated to the prophet Zechariah was noticed by Edward Robinson in 1838, while van de Velde,  recorded its name as Kefr Zakaria in the 1850s.

In 1863 Victor Guérin found the place to have five hundred inhabitants, while an Ottoman village list of about 1870 showed that Az-Zakariyya had 41  houses and a population of 128, though the population count included men only.

In  1883,  the PEF's Survey of Western Palestine described  Zakariyya as sitting on a slope above a broad valley surrounded by olive groves.

British Mandate era
In the 1922 census of Palestine conducted  by the British Mandate authorities,  Zakaria  had a population of 683, all Muslim, increasing in  the 1931 census to 742, still all Muslims, in 189 occupied houses.

In the  1945 statistics the population was 1,180, all Muslims, with a total of 15,320 dunams of land. In 1944/45 a total of 6,523 dunums of village land was allocated to cereals,   961 dunums were irrigated or used for orchards, of which 440 dunums were planted with olive trees, while 70  dunams were built-up (urban) areas. In the 1946 Tax Form of Mandatory Palestine, there were 357 "assessable inhabitants" living in Zakariyya, of which 232 were landowners.

1948 and aftermath
The village was located inside the territory allotted to a future Arab state in the UN's 1947 partition plan.

In the 1948 Arab–Israeli War, Az-Zakariyya was the longest lasting Arab community in the southern Jerusalem Corridor. The village was captured in October 1948 during Operation Ha-Har, when the Israeli military used artillery to shell Az-Zakariyya and stormed the village at night. In the course of Operation Yoav, the 54th Battalion of the Givati Brigade, found the village "almost empty", as most of the residents had temporarily fled to the nearby hills. Two residents were executed by Israeli soldiers. Many of the villagers returned to their homes after the cessation of hostilities. In December 1948 the army evicted about 40 "old men and women" to the West Bank.

In March 1949 the Interior Ministry requested the eviction of "145 or so" remaining villagers:  the official in charge of the Jerusalem District said there were many good houses in the village which could be used to accommodate several hundred new Jewish immigrants. In January 1950 David Ben-Gurion, Moshe Sharett and Yosef Weitz decided  to evict the villagers, "but without coercion." On March 19, 1950, the transfer of the Arabs of Zakariya was approved and the order was carried out on June 9, 1950. The manner of expulsion of the villagers is not mentioned.  The people of Zakariyya were evicted on 17 May 1950 by the military. Fifteen families comprising 65 people, were transferred to the town of Ramla, while the rest of the community, some 130 people, were taken to a location near the Jordanian border where they were ordered to walk over. To hasten the process, "soldiers shot in the air several times". They eventually settled in the West Bank refugee camps of al-Arroub and Dheisheh Refugee Camp, where the village's war refugees had settled.

Two weeks after the village was emptied, the Jewish Agency resettled families of Jewish-Kurdish settlers near the village, later moving them inside the former Palestinian village to become residents of a new moshav, now Hebraized as Zekharia.

During the 1960s, most of the buildings in the village were destroyed as part of a national program to "level" depopulated villages.

In 1992, Walid Khalidi described the remaining structures: "The mosque and a number of houses, some occupied by Jewish residents and others deserted, remain on the site. Large sections of the site itself are covered with wild vegetation. The mosque is in a state of neglect and an Israeli flag is planted on top of the minaret. [..] One of the occupied houses is a two-storey stone structure with a flat roof. Its second story windows have round arches and grillwork. Parts of the surrounding lands are cultivated by Israeli farmers."

Culture
The village was known for its Palestinian costumes. A wedding dress from Zakariyya (ca. 1930)  is part of the collection in Museum of International Folk Art (MOIFA) at Museum of New Mexico at Santa Fe.

Notable residents
 Nasr Abdel Aziz Eleyan

Gallery

References

Bibliography

  Zakariyya: pp. 1–17
 

 
  
  
  

 
 
 
  

 
  
 
 
 
 
 
  (A catalog of the  Museum of International Folk Art (MOIFA) at Santa Fe's  collection of Palestinian clothing and jewellery.)

External links 
Welcome to Zakariyya
Zakariyya, Zochrot
Survey of Western Palestine, Map 17: IAA, Wikimedia commons

Arab villages depopulated after the 1948 Arab–Israeli War
District of Hebron